George Washington Brown is a pseudonym used by two musicians:

Pete Gofton (born 1975), English musician and producer
Van Dyke Parks (born 1943), American composer, arranger, producer, musician, singer, and actor

See also
George Washington Browne (1853–1939), Scottish architect
George Brown (disambiguation)